WXXS is a hot AC/full-service formatted broadcast radio station licensed to Lancaster, New Hampshire, serving northern New Hampshire and the Northeast Kingdom of Vermont.

History
WXXS has been owned and operated by Barry P. Lunderville since May 1998. WXXS was the first station he purchased. In early 2008, Lunderville founded Radio New England Broadcasting, LLC. In August 1997, a construction permit to build a Class A radio station in Lancaster, New Hampshire was obtained.  First signing on in late 1997 as WNHT with an Adult Contemporary/Country Radio Station format at 700 watts, the station soon boosted their power to 1,500 watts.  On January 30, 1998 the calls were switched to WXXS. WXXS would later obtain Class C3 status from their previous Class A.  Around the time of their power upgrade, WXXS switched from their Adult Contemporary/Country hybrid format for its current hot AC/full-service format. From August 2009 to Summer 2010 WKDR in Berlin simulcasted WXXS. In the Summer of 2010 WKDR became a simulcast of WOTX and currently, WXXS is simulcast on WMOU in Berlin except WXXS does not carry local sports of WMOU and WMOU simulcasts WLTN-FM's morning show.

Translators
In addition to the main station, WXXS is relayed by several translators.

References

External links
 
 
 
 2008 Ownership Update
 Broadcast History

XXS
Coös County, New Hampshire
Radio stations established in 1998
Contemporary hit radio stations in the United States